The Pizhemskaya narrow gauge railway is a narrow-gauge railway in Nizhny Novgorod Oblast, Russia, built as an industrial railway (forest railway) for logging operations.

Current status 
Planning for the railway and building began in 1926. The Pizhemskaya logging railway's first line was constructed in 1926, in the area of Tonshayevsky District in Nizhny Novgorod Oblast from the village Pizhma. The railway operates scheduled freight services from Pizhma, used for forestry tasks such as the transportation of felled logs and forestry workers. In 2017, repairs are being made to the track.

Rolling stock

Locomotives 
 TU6A – № 0755, 3068
 Draisine – TD-5u "Pioneer" transportation local residents

Railroad cars 
 Tank car
 Bunk Car "Teplushka"
 Railway log-car and flatcar
 Hopper car to transport track ballast

Work trains 
 Snowplow PS-1

See also
Narrow-gauge railways in Russia
Narrow-gauge railway of Decor-1 factory
List of Russian narrow-gauge railways rolling stock

References

External links

 Pizhemskaya narrow gauge railway «The site of the railroad» S. Bolashenko 
 Pizhemskaya logging railroad 2006 

750 mm gauge railways in Russia
Rail transport in Nizhny Novgorod Oblast
Railway lines opened in 1926
Logging railways in Russia